Tamayura is a Japanese anime series directed by Junichi Sato. The series revolves around Fū "Potte" Sawatari, a photography-loving girl who moves to the town where she grew up with her late father and spends time hanging with her friends. Hal Film Maker produced four original video animation (OVA) episodes which aired on AT-X between September 6 and December 6, 2010, before receiving release on DVD and Blu-ray Disc (BD) in two volumes released on November 26 and December 23, 2010, respectively. This was followed by a twelve-episode anime television series titled Tamayura: Hitotose and produced by TYO Animations, which aired in Japan between October 3 and December 19, 2011. The series was released on DVD and Blu-ray Disc between December 21, 2011, and June 27, 2012, the last volume of which included a bonus OVA episode. A second television season, Tamayura: More Aggressive, aired in Japan between July 3, 2013, and September 18, 2013, with an OVA episode released on June 14, 2014. A four-part film series, Tamayura: Sotsugyō Shashin, was released between April 4, 2015, and April 2, 2016.

The OVAs have four pieces of theme music: one opening theme, two ending themes, and one insert song. "Melody" was used for episode two in the BD/DVD version, and for episodes one through three for the TV broadcast. "Natsudori" was used for episode four for both the BD/DVD version and TV broadcast version. The insert song , also by Nakajima, was featured in episode three. The opening theme single was released on October 20, 2010. The single containing the ending themes and insert song was released on November 24, 2010. The OVA's original soundtrack was released on December 22, 2010.

Episode list

Tamayura (2010 OVA series)

Tamayura: Hitotose (2011 TV series)

Tamayura: More Aggressive (2013 TV series)

Tamayura: Sotsugyō Shashin (2015 Film series)

References

Tamayura